Imphal International Airport , formerly known as Tulihal International Airport and officially renamed as Bir Tikendrajit International Airport, is an international airport serving Imphal, the capital of Manipur, India, located 7 km south from the city centre. It is the second largest and the third-busiest airport in North-East India after Lokpriya Gopinath Bordoloi International Airport in Guwahati and Maharaja Bir Bikram Airport in Agartala.

Development 

In June 2019, Airports Authority of India (AAI) implemented  projects for the upgradation of various airports in the northeastern region.  will be spent for further upgradation of Imphal Airport. The project includes a  integrated terminal building and airside infrastructure like new aircraft parking bays and link taxiways, a new Air Traffic Control (ATC) tower and a control and technical block.

The new terminal building will have an area of 28,125 sq.m. to handle 1,200 peak hour passengers (200 international & 1,000 domestic), an apron with 4 aerobridges and 8 parking bays for Airbus A321 type aircraft, 2 link taxiways, and an ATC tower.

Airlines and destinations

Statistics

Accidents and incidents 
 On 16 August 1991, Indian Airlines Flight 257 crashed while on approach to the airport, killing all 69 people on board.

Gallery

See also 
 Kangla Helipad (Manung Kangjeibung)
 Kakching#Aerodrome

Notes

References

External links 

 Imphal Airport at the Airports Authority of India

Airports in Manipur
International airports in India
Airfields of the United States Army Air Forces in British India
Buildings and structures in Imphal
World War II sites in India
Transport in Imphal
Airports with year of establishment missing